Liliyana Lyubenova Aleksandrova (born 26 February 1943) is a Bulgarian gymnast. She competed in five events at the 1964 Summer Olympics.

References

External links
 

1943 births
Living people
Bulgarian female artistic gymnasts
Olympic gymnasts of Bulgaria
Gymnasts at the 1964 Summer Olympics
Place of birth missing (living people)